DGB Financial Group (Korean: DGB금융그룹,( abbreviated as DGBFG) is a South Korean banking holding company headquartered in Daegu. Its flagship company, Daegu Bank, is one of the largest regional banks in the country, mostly serving customers in the Daegu-Gyeongbuk region.

Background 
The group was founded on May 17, 2011 upon the Financial Supervisory Service's approval for the establishment of a financial holding company for Daegu Bank and its two arms, Daegu Credit Information and Kardnet. Ha Chun-soo is currently serving as president and CEO of both Daegu Bank and DGB Financial.

Relationship with United Nations 
DGB Financial Group first joined the United Nations Global Compact on July 18, 2006, to support ten universal values in the areas of labour, human rights, environmental protection, and anti-corruption. The company signed the United Nations Environment Programme (UNEP) statement on September 27, 2006.

See also 

List of banks in South Korea
Daegu
Gyeongbuk
DGB Daegu Bank Park

References

External links 
 

Financial services companies of South Korea
Companies listed on the Korea Exchange
Companies based in Daegu
Banks established in 1967
South Korean brands